El Mirage Lake is a dry lake bed in the northwestern Victor Valley of the central Mojave Desert, within San Bernardino County, California.

El Mirage Off-Highway Vehicle Recreation Area (OHV)

Formerly open to all visitors, it has been a popular spot for many activities ranging from gyrocopter and ultralight aircraft operations to automobile racing.  The Bureau of Land Management has installed a fence to enclose the lake and some of the surrounding areas, and now charges fees for entry to what is now known as the El Mirage Off-Highway Vehicle (OHV) Recreation Area. It is a popular filming location for automobile commercials. Permits for the Recreation Area can be purchased on-site, at local retailers and online. Annual permits are $90, weekly permits are $30, and daily permits are $15. Private aircraft may still land on the lakebed.

For 50 years the lakebed has been used by the Southern California Timing Association for timed speed runs. The club also operates the Bonneville Salt Flats speed runs.

Climate
El Mirage Lakebed experiences a desert climate, with cool winters and hot summers. Due to the lakebed's aridity and high elevation, the diurnal temperature variation is substantial. Though summer days can be very hot, summer nighttime temperatures are cool. The lakebed receives an occasional dusting of snow in the winter months, however, snowfall usually melts within 24 hours.

See also

 El Mirage, California — adjacent to the lakebed.
 
 
 List of lakes in California

References
California Road & Recreation Atlas, 2005, pg. 104

External links
 
 El Mirage OHV Recreation Area
 El Mirage OHV Recreation Area Online Permit Sales
 Ultralight Flying at El Mirage Lake

Lakes of the Mojave Desert
Lakes of San Bernardino County, California
Endorheic lakes of California
Salt flats of California
Victor Valley
Landforms of San Bernardino County, California
Lakes of Southern California
Lakes of California